Lynn Lake Airport  is an airport located adjacent to Lynn Lake, Manitoba, Canada. It features a  paved runway, and is the furthest north runway of its type accessible by highway in Manitoba.

The airport was set to close on 6 May 2013 due to costs, although a provincial spokesperson stated in the Winnipeg Free Press, "It's important for the northern economy and we'll be looking at it in the short and long term".

After entering into a public/private partnership with YYL Airport Inc. for the continued operation of the airport, long-term operational status is being achieved.

See also
Lynn Lake (Eldon Lake) Water Aerodrome

References

External links

Certified airports in Manitoba